Glass Harp is the debut album by American rock band Glass Harp. It was released in 1970 on Decca Records. The album was produced by Lewis Merenstein and engineered by Ron Johnsen at Electric Lady Studios.

Track listing 
"Can You See Me" (Daniel Pecchio, Phil Keaggy) – 6:25 	
"Children's Fantasy" (Phil Keaggy) – 4:10 	
"Changes (In the Heart of My Own True Love)" (John Sferra) – 6:00 	
"Village Queen" (Daniel Pecchio) – 4:00 	
"Black Horse" (John Sferra) – 2:50 	
"Southbound" (John Sferra, Phil Keaggy) – 3:50 	
"Whatever Life Demands" (Daniel Pecchio, Phil Keaggy) – 6:30 	
"Look in the Sky" (Daniel Pecchio, John Sferra, Phil Keaggy) – 8:10 	
"Garden" (Daniel Pecchio, John Sferra, Phil Keaggy) – 4:21 	
"On Our Own" (John Sferra, Phil Keaggy) – 2:30

Personnel 
Glass Harp
Phil Keaggy – guitars, vocals
John Sferra – drums, vocals, guitars
Daniel Pecchio – bass, vocals, flute
with:
John Cale – electric viola
Larry Fallon - string arrangements
Technical
Ron Johnsen - engineer
Ernie Cefalu - album design
Bill Levy - cover photography

References 

1970 debut albums
Albums recorded at Electric Lady Studios
albums arranged by Larry Fallon
Albums produced by Lewis Merenstein
Decca Records albums
Glass Harp (band) albums